"Monster" is a song recorded by Japanese boy band Arashi. It was released on May 19, 2010 by their record label J Storm, as part of the CD single of the same name. The single was released as a regular edition, containing the title song, the song "Spiral", and their instrumental versions; and a limited edition, containing both songs and a DVD. "Monster" was used as the theme song for a drama starring Arashi member Satoshi Ohno.

Single information
On April 5, 2010, it was announced that Arashi would provide the theme song "Monster" for Ohno's fantasy comedy drama based on Fujiko Fujio's manga series . 
The single was released in two formats: a regular edition, which included A-side "Monster", the B-side  and the instrumentals for both the tracks; and a limited edition, which included the two tracks and a DVD containing the promotional video for "Monster" and its making of.

The song's music video was included in their official YouTube channel, when it opened in 2019, and later on, also a live version. The song was also included in their official pages of streaming sites Apple Music, Spotify, and the such.

Chart performance
The single sold about 232,000 copies on the first day of its release on May 19, 2010, debuting at number one on the Oricon singles daily chart. On the Oricon singles weekly chart, the single placed at number one, selling about 543,000 copies. "Monster" also became Arashi's thirtieth consecutive single to rank within the Top 3 since their debut single, making Arashi the first act to achieve such a feat.

On June 24, 2010, "Monster" placed at number-one on the Oricon first half of the year singles chart by selling 654,287 copies overall. According to Oricon, "Monster" is the fourth best-selling single of 2010 in Japan.

Track listing

Charts and certifications

Weekly charts

Year-end charts

Certifications

Release history

References

External links
Product information 

2010 singles
Arashi songs
Billboard Japan Hot 100 number-one singles
Oricon Weekly number-one singles
Japanese television drama theme songs
J Storm singles
2010 songs